"The Perfect Year" is a song by English singer-songwriter Dina Carroll. It is taken from the 1993 musical Sunset Boulevard and was released as a single on 29 November 1993. Later, it was included on Carroll's second album, Only Human (1996). Becoming one of her most successful songs, it peaked at number five in the United Kingdom and number four in Ireland. On the Eurochart Hot 100, it reached number 17 in January 1994. In 2001, the song was included on Carroll's compilation album, The Very Best of Dina Carroll.

Critical reception
Hannsjörg Riemann from German Bravo gave the song two out of five, stating that Carroll "can sing really well." He viewed it as a "tearjerker" that "doesn't tear me off my stool despite the noble design." In his weekly UK chart commentary, James Masterton described the song as a "Christmassy ballad". Alan Jones from Music Week rated it five out of five and named it Pick of the Week, writing, "This heartwarming ballad from Sunset Boulevard with sweeping strings, a powerful vocal and optimistic, seasonal lyrics could easily end Carroll's perfect year by becoming her first number one single." James Hamilton from the RM Dance Update complimented it as a "gorgeous Lloyd Webber radio ballad". German band Culture Beat reviewed it for Smash Hits, giving it four out of five. Jay Supreme said, "This is a real sweet song though and a great song if the mood is right." Tania Evans stated, "I'd say this is the best she's done so far. Dina is brilliant."

Music video
A music video was produced to promote the single. It has a sepia tone and was filmed in Dublin, Ireland.

Track listings

Charts

Weekly charts

Year-end charts

References

Dina Carroll songs
1990s ballads
1993 singles
1993 songs
A&M Records singles
First Avenue Records singles
Songs from musicals
Songs with lyrics by Don Black (lyricist)
Songs with music by Andrew Lloyd Webber
New Year songs